Barry Ardern (born May 12, 1946 in Ottawa, Ontario) is a former defensive back in the Canadian Football League for ten years. Ardern won the Grey Cup three times, in 1968 and 1969 with the Ottawa Rough Riders and in 1977 with the Montreal Alouettes.

References

1946 births
Living people
Canadian football defensive backs
Ottawa Rough Riders players
BC Lions players
Saskatchewan Roughriders players
Montreal Alouettes players
Players of Canadian football from Ontario
Canadian football people from Ottawa